Babi Island or Pulau Babi may refer to:
Pulau Besar (Johor) in Malaysia, previously known as Pulau Babi Besar
Babi Island (Aceh) in Indonesia
Babi Island (Flores) in Indonesia
Babi Kecil Island, Belitung in Indonesia